The Gunther Building may refer to one of the following:
 Gunther Building (Broome Street), New York City
 Gunther Building (Fifth Avenue), New York City

See also
 Gunter Building, North Carolina